The Silver Swan is an automaton dating from the 18th century and housed in the Bowes Museum, Barnard Castle, Teesdale, County Durham, England. It was acquired by John Bowes, the museum's founder, from a Parisian jeweler in 1872.

The swan, which is life-sized, is a clockwork-driven device that includes a music box. The swan sits in a "stream" made of glass rods and surrounded by silver leaves. Small silver fish can be seen "swimming" in the stream.

When the clockwork is wound, the music box plays and the glass rods rotate giving the illusion of flowing water. The swan turns its head from side to side and also preens itself. After a few moments the swan notices the swimming fish and bends down to catch and eat one. The swan's head then returns to the upright position and the performance, which lasts about 32 seconds, is over. To help preserve the mechanism, the swan was only operated once each day, at 2pm. The museum was closed during 2020 and 2021 so the daily display did not take place; when the exhibit was being prepared for reopening in May 2021 the clockwork mechanism was found to have seized up and it was withdrawn from display for further conservation.

The mechanism was designed and built by the Low Countries inventor John Joseph Merlin (1735–1803) in conjunction with the London inventor James Cox (1723–1800) in 1773.

The swan was described in a 1773 Act of Parliament as being 3 feet (0.91 m) in diameter and 18 feet (5.49 m) high. This would seem to indicate that at one time there was more to the swan than remains today as it is no longer that high. It is said that there was originally a waterfall behind the swan, which was stolen while it was on tour – this could possibly explain the height which is now 'missing'.

It is known that the swan was sold several times and was shown at the Exposition Universelle held in Paris in 1867. The American novelist Mark Twain observed the swan and recorded his observation in a chapter of the Innocents Abroad, writing that the swan "had a living grace about his movement and a living intelligence in his eyes."

In 2017 starting in February  the swan spent 6 weeks at the Science Museum as part of an exhibition on robots. In October 2021, the Bowes Museum hosted a 'Silver Swan Study Week', led by clockmaker-conservator Matthew Read. During the week, visitors were able to watch a group of specialist conservators and curators dismantle the swan as they explored the mechanical condition of the object, ahead of creating a conservation plan for its preservation.

The Bowes Museum believes that the Swan is their best-known artefact, and it is the basis of the museum's logo.

Notes

References and further reading

External links

The Silver Swan, description on the website of the Bowes Museum
Silver Swan, photos and a description on an educational site 
HD video of the silver swan in motion

Tourist attractions in County Durham
Automata (mechanical)
Robots of the United Kingdom
18th-century robots
Swans
Robotic animals